Jagathy Jagadeesh in Town is a 2002 Indian Malayalam film, directed by Nissar, starring Jagathy Sreekumar and Jagadish in the lead role, both of them playing dual roles. The comedy flick revolves around pairs of twin brothers born to the same family, with exchanged identities.

Plot

Devaki Amma gave birth to twins twice and Nurse Santh Devi got one among each of them at the time of the deliveries. Rajamma's husband was a thief . They were brought up under his guidance. Devaki Amma's children are brought up in an affluent family that enabled them to become efficient cops in the future, while among the other two kids, one becomes a thief while the other, an artist.

After years, the four of them meet. What happens next forms the rest of the film.

Cast

References

External links

2002 films
2000s Malayalam-language films
Films directed by Nissar